Chuck Wiley (born September 12, 1964, in Arizona) is a male freestyle swimmer from United States. He represented his native country at the 1998 World Aquatics Championships in Perth, Western Australia, competing in one individual event (25 km).

References
USA Swimming

1964 births
Living people
American male freestyle swimmers
Male long-distance swimmers
World Aquatics Championships medalists in open water swimming
20th-century American people
21st-century American people